Gavin Maxwell FRSL FZS FRGS (15 July 19147 September 1969) was a British naturalist and author, best known for his non-fiction writing and his work with otters. He wrote the book Ring of Bright Water (1960) about how he brought an otter back from Iraq and raised it in Scotland. The otter was of a previously unknown sub-species which was subsequently named after Maxwell. Ring of Bright Water sold more than a million copies and was made into a film starring Bill Travers and Virginia McKenna in 1969.

Biography

Gavin Maxwell was the youngest son of Lieutenant-Colonel Aymer Maxwell and Lady Mary Percy, fifth daughter of the seventh Duke of Northumberland. His paternal grandfather, Sir Herbert Maxwell, 7th Baronet, was an archaeologist, politician and natural historian.

Maxwell was born at The House of Elrig near the small village of Elrig, near Port William, in Wigtownshire, south-western Scotland. Maxwell's relatives still live in the area and the family's ancient estate and grounds are in nearby Monreith.

Maxwell's education took place at a succession of preparatory and public schools, including the sporty Heddon Court School at East Barnet, St Cyprian's School, where he found encouragement for his interest in natural history, and Stowe School. In The Rocks Remain, he relates how family pressure led him to take a degree in Estate Management at Hertford College, Oxford, where he spent his time pursuing sporting and leisure activities instead of studying. He cheated his way through the intermediate exams but passed the final examinations honestly, having crammed the entire three-year course in six weeks.

During World War II, Maxwell served as an instructor with the Special Operations Executive. He was invalided out with the rank of Major in 1944. After the war, he purchased the Isle of Soay off Skye in the Inner Hebrides, Scotland. According to his book Harpoon at a Venture (1952), bad planning and a lack of finance meant his attempt to establish a basking shark fishery there between 1945 and 1948 proved unsuccessful and the island was sold on to his business partner, Tex Geddes. He became a close friend of Elias Canetti.

In 1956, Maxwell toured the reed marshes of southern Iraq with explorer Wilfred Thesiger, Maxwell's wife's first cousin once removed. Maxwell's account of their trip appears in A Reed Shaken By The Wind, later published under the title People of the Reeds. It was hailed by The New York Times as "near perfect".

Maxwell next moved to Sandaig (which he called Camusfeàrna in his books), a small community opposite Isleornsay on a remote part of the Scottish mainland. This is where his "otter books" are set. After Ring of Bright Water (1960), his newfound fame did not sit well with him:

In The Rocks Remain (1963), the otters Edal, Teko, Mossy and Monday show great differences in personality. The book demonstrates the difficulty Maxwell was having, possibly as a result of his mental state, in remaining focused on one project and the impact that had on his otters, Sandaig and his own life.

In 1966, he travelled to Morocco, tracing the dramatic lives of the last rulers of Marrakech under the French. His account of the trip was published as Lords of the Atlas: The Rise and Fall of the House of Glaoua 1893–1956. During the Moroccan Years of Lead, the regime there considered his book subversive and banned its importation.

In The House of Elrig (1965), Maxwell describes his family history and his passion for the calf-country, Galloway, where he was born. It was during this period that he met ornithologist Peter Scott and the young Terry Nutkins, who later became a children's television presenter. Privately homosexual, Maxwell married Lavinia Renton (daughter of The Right Honourable Sir Alan Lascelles and granddaughter of Viscount Chelmsford, Wilfred Thesiger's uncle) on 1 February 1962. The marriage lasted little more than a year and they divorced in 1964. Maxwell also lived in Paultons Square in London.

In 1968, Maxwell's Sandaig home was destroyed by fire, in which Edal perished, and he moved to the lighthouse keepers' cottages on Eilean Bàn (White Island), an island between the Isle of Skye and the Scottish mainland by Kyleakin. He invited John Lister-Kaye to join him on Eilean Bàn and help him build a zoo on the island and work on a book about British wild mammals. Lister-Kaye accepted the invitation, but both projects were abandoned when Maxwell died from lung cancer in hospital in Inverness the following year.

Eilean Bàn now supports a pier of the Skye Bridge, built during the 1990s. Despite modern traffic a hundred feet or so above it, the island is a commemorative otter sanctuary and houses a museum dedicated to Maxwell. Another memorial is a bronze otter erected at Monreith near to St Medan's Golf Club.

According to Douglas Botting, Maxwell suffered from bipolar disorder throughout his life. Maxwell's literary agent was Peter Janson-Smith, who was also agent for James Bond author Ian Fleming.

Maxwell's otter

Maxwell's book Ring of Bright Water describes how, in 1956, he brought a smooth-coated otter back from Iraq and raised it in "Camusfearna" at Sandaig Bay on the west coast of Scotland.  He took the otter, called Mijbil, to the London Zoological Society, where it was decided that this was a previously unknown subspecies of smooth-coated otter. It was therefore named Lutrogale perspicillata maxwelli (or, colloquially, "Maxwell's otter") after him. While it was thought to have become extinct in the alluvial salt marshes of Iraq as a result of the large-scale drainage of the area that started in the 1960s, newer surveys suggest large populations remain throughout its range.

In his book The Marsh Arabs, Wilfred Thesiger wrote:

The otter became woven into the fabric of Maxwell's life. The title  of his book Ring of Bright Water was taken from the poem "The Marriage of Psyche" by Kathleen Raine, who said in her autobiography that Maxwell had been the love of her life. Raine's relationship with Maxwell deteriorated after 1956 when she indirectly caused the death of Mijbil. Raine held herself responsible not only for losing Mijbil but for a curse she had uttered shortly beforehand, frustrated by Maxwell's homosexuality: "Let Gavin suffer in this place as I am suffering now."  Raine blamed herself thereafter for all Maxwell's misfortunes, beginning with Mijbil's death and ending with the cancer that took his 55-year-old life on 7 September 1969.

Maxwell's ashes were placed beneath a boulder at the former site of his house Camusfeàrna. The boulder marks the position of his writing desk.

Bibliography
Harpoon at a Venture Rupert Hart-Davis (1952)
 Paperback reissue (1984): 
 Paperback reissue (1998): 
 Paperback reissue (2013): 
God Protect Me from My Friends Longmans (1956)
 Paperback reissue (1972): 
A Reed Shaken By The Wind - a Journey Through the Unexplored Marshlands of Iraq Longmans (1959)
 Paperback reissue (1983): 
 Paperback reissue (Eland Books, 2003) 
The Ten Pains of Death (1959)
 Paperback reissue (1986): 
Ring of Bright Water (illustrated by Peter Scott) Longmans (1960)
 Paperback reissue: 
 Ein Ring aus hellem Wasser - Meine Jahre an Schottlands wilder Westküste, ins Deutsche übersetzt von Iris Hansen, München : Blessing, 2021, 
The Otters' Tale Longmans (1962; a children's version of Ring of Bright Water)
The Rocks Remain Longmans (1963)
The House of Elrig Longmans (1965)
Lords of the Atlas: Morocco, the rise and fall of the House of Glaoua Longmans (1966)
 Reissue, (Eland Books) (2000) 
Seals of the World (1967)
Raven Seek The Brother Longmans (1969)
The Ring of Bright Water Trilogy Penguin (2001; abridged)

Biography
 Island of Dreams: Stalking Gavin Maxwell's Ghost by Dan Boothby, Cork Street Books (2014)
 republished as Island of Dreams: A Personal History of a Remarkable Place, Picador (2015) 
 The White Island by John Lister-Kaye (about the author's time working with Maxwell) Longman (1972) 
 Maxwell's Ghost - An Epilogue to Gavin Maxwell's Camusfearna by Richard Frere, Victor Gollancz (1976) 
 reissued (1999) 
 reissued (2011) 
 Gavin Maxwell, A Life by Douglas Botting, HarperCollins (1993)  (authorized biography)
 republished as The Saga of Ring of Bright Water - The Enigma of Gavin Maxwell Neil Wilson Publishing (2000)

References

External links
Biography by Maxwell's nephew
Eilean Bàn
Maxwell's Otter
IUCN listing for Maxwell's Otter
Visit Camusfearna (Sandaig)

Further reading 
Maxwell, Gavin, (1914–7 Sept. 1969), Sponsor of the Dolci Cttee; Hon. Life Member: Wildfowl Trust; Cttee, Wildlife Youth Service; Fauna Preservation Soc.; Internat. Cttee, Centro Studi e Scambi Internazionali; Cttee of Honour Nat. Campaign for the Abolition of Capital Punishment; Pres., British Junior Exploration Soc.; writer since 1952; portrait painter, 1949–52, doi.org/10.1093/ww/9780199540884.013.U57666   Who's Who  (published online: 1 December 2007)

1914 births
1969 deaths
Scottish military personnel
Alumni of Hertford College, Oxford
People from Dumfries and Galloway
People educated at St Cyprian's School
People educated at Stowe School
Scottish naturalists
Scottish soldiers
20th-century Scottish male writers
Scottish nature writers
Scottish people of English descent
Scottish bisexual writers
Bisexual men
British Special Operations Executive personnel
Deaths from lung cancer in Scotland
Fellows of the Royal Society of Literature
Fellows of the Royal Geographical Society
People with bipolar disorder
20th-century naturalists
20th-century Scottish LGBT people